Mirwan Kassouf (born 12 November 1964) is a Lebanese boxer. He competed in the men's middleweight event at the 1988 Summer Olympics.

References

1964 births
Living people
Lebanese male boxers
Olympic boxers of Lebanon
Boxers at the 1988 Summer Olympics
Place of birth missing (living people)
Middleweight boxers